Andrea Goldsmith may refer to:

 Andrea Goldsmith (engineer), American electrical engineer
 Andrea Goldsmith (writer) (born 1950), Australian writer and novelist